Zona is a species of fish.

Zona may also refer to:
Zona, West Virginia
 Herpes zoster or zona, a viral disease characterized by a painful skin rash with blisters
 Zona (streaming video software), a file-sharing video streaming client
 Arizona Wildcats, sports teams of the University of Arizona
 Zona: A Book About a Film About a Journey to a Room, a 2012 book by Geoff Dyer

People with the given name
Zona Gale, American author
Zona Maie Griswold, singer
Zona Jones, singer
Zona Vallance, writer and lecturer

See also
Zona incerta, a horizontally elongated region of gray matter cells in the subthalamus below the thalamus
Zona pellucida, a glycoprotein membrane surrounding the plasma membrane of an oocyte
Zona Rosa, Mexico City